Joseph Altuzarra (born 1983), is a French-American luxury women's ready-to-wear clothing designer. He launched his brand, Altuzarra, in New York in 2008.  His brand is influenced by his multicultural upbringing and his international education in fashion. His design of a women's evening gown was featured on the runway of the 2019 Met Gala evening. Altuzarra was one of the judges in season 1 of Amazon's Making the Cut.

Biography 
Altuzarra was born in 1983 in Paris, to a Chinese-American mother and a French father. His parents are both investment bankers. As a boy he studied ballet for eight years. Altuzarra graduated from Swarthmore College with a B.A. in Art and Art History. Upon heading to New York, he interned at Marc Jacobs before his post at Proenza Schouler. Seeking to further enhance his technical construction skills, Altuzarra then apprenticed with patternmaker Nicolas Caïto, the former head of the Rochas atelier. Altuzarra later returned to Paris, working as first assistant to Givenchy's Riccardo Tisci.

In 2019, his design of a women's all gold, full-length evening gown was worn by Awkwafina at the 2019 Met Gala whom he accompanied on the runway and entrance staircase on the evening of the event.

Awards

References

External links 
 Altuzarra Homepage
 Altuzarra Collections: Style.com

1983 births
French fashion designers
French people of American descent
French people of Chinese descent
Living people
Swarthmore College alumni
French emigrants to the United States